Turtlecreek Township is one of the eleven townships of Warren County, Ohio, United States.  It is in the central part of the county and surrounds the county seat of Lebanon.  Turtlecreek is the largest township in the county, originally containing sixty-three whole and seven fractional sections.  It had a population of 12,617 in 2000, up from 10,383 in 1990.  Of those, 12,114 lived in the unincorporated part of the township, 456 in Middletown, and 47 in Monroe.

Geography
Located in the central and western parts of the county, it borders the following townships:
Clearcreek Township - north
Wayne Township - northeast
Washington Township - east, across the Little Miami River
Salem Township - southeast
Union Township - south
Deerfield Township - southwest
Lemon Township, Butler County - west, north of Liberty Township
Liberty Township, Butler County - west, south of Liberty Township
Franklin Township - northwest

The city of Lebanon withdrew from the township in the 1960s and formed a paper township.  Portions of the township have also been lost to annexations by the cities of Monroe, Middletown, and Mason.  Those areas within Monroe, however, remain in the township.

Most of the township was in the Symmes Purchase, but the two northernmost rows of sections were not, though they are surveyed in the same manner as the Purchase.

The township is named for the Turtle Creek, a stream named for Indian chief Little Turtle.  It is the only Turtlecreek Township statewide, although there is a Turtle Creek Township in Shelby County.

History
Turtlecreek Township was established by the Warren County Commissioners on August 15, 1804.

Government
The township is governed by a three-member board of trustees, who are elected in November of odd-numbered years to a four-year term beginning on the following January 1.  Two are elected in the year after the presidential election and one is elected in the year before it.  There is also an elected township fiscal officer, who serves a four-year term beginning on April 1 of the year after the election, which is held in November of the year before the presidential election.  Vacancies in the fiscal officership or on the board of trustees are filled by the remaining trustees.

There are two large state prisons located in the western part of the township:  Lebanon Correctional Institution and Warren Correctional Institution.

Public services
Both Interstate 75 and Interstate 71 cross the township, as do U.S. Route 42 and State Routes 48, 63, 123, 350, and 741.  The Lebanon-Warren County Airport is located in Turtlecreek Township on Greentree Road between Lebanon and Greentree Corners.

Most of the township is in the Lebanon City School District but a portion of the north center is in the Springboro Community City School District.  The portion within the city of Monroe was detached circa 2002 and placed in the new Monroe Local School District.  A part in the northwest is in the Middletown City School District, a part in the southwest is in the Mason City School District, and a part in the southeast is in the Little Miami School District.

Most of Turtlecreek Township is served by the Lebanon (45036) and Oregonia (45054) post offices, but parts are served by Middletown (45044), Monroe (45050), Mason (45040), and Franklin (45005).  Most of the township is in the Lebanon telephone exchange but parts are within the Mason, Franklin, Morrow, Monroe, and Middletown exchanges.

References

External links
County website

Turtlecreek Township, Ohio